Liora Ofer (Hebrew: ליאורה עופר; born December 22, 1953) is an Israeli real estate business executive who inherited the Israeli companies Ofer Investments and Melisron from her father, Yuli Ofer. She is the chairperson of these two companies. As of 28 April 2021, Ofer has a total net worth of $1.4 billion.

Biography
Liora Ofer was born in Haifa, Israel, where she studied at the Hebrew Reali School. At the age of 20, she began working with her father, the late Israeli billionaire Yuli Ofer, at Ofer Investments, which he founded in 1957 together with his brother, Sammy Ofer.

Business career
In 1995, Ofer was appointed General Manager of Coral Beach Eilat Ltd. and in 2007 as the Director and Vice Chairperson of Melisron. In 2008, she was named Chairperson of the company’s Board of Directors. Under Ofer's leadership, Melisron became one of Israel’s largest real estate companies. Its acquisitions included 25 shopping malls from British Israel Investments Ltd. and  Ramat Aviv mall.

Controversy
In 2015, Ofer won a court battle, with her brother Doron, over their inheritance, which left her with a 52% controlling stake in Ofer Investments.

References

Israeli business executives
21st-century Israeli businesswomen
21st-century Israeli businesspeople
1953 births
Living people
20th-century Israeli businesswomen
20th-century Israeli businesspeople